The Greystone, also known as the Greystone Hotel is a fourteen-story building at 212-218 W. 91st Street on Manhattan's Upper West Side. Samuel and Henry A. Blumenthal bought the property from the Astor estate in 1922 with marketing beginning two years later. It was designed by the architectural firm of Schwartz & Gross.

The building is currently in residential use and the former ballroom has since been a series of restaurants including Polistina's and Big Daddy's.

Among its notable residents was Alberto Arroyo.

References

1924 architecture